The Goeng or Gureng were an Aboriginal Australian people of the state of Queensland. They lived in the area of the area of present-day Gladstone.

Country
The traditional tribal lands of the Goeng, according to Norman Tindale, stretched over an estimated , running from the southern end of Port Curtis to near mouth of Baffle Creek. Their inland extension went as far as the headwaters of the Kolan River, and took in the ManyPeaks Range. Their land also included Lowmead and one of their borders touched Miriam Vale.

Controversy
John Mathew identified the Goeng and the Goreng goreng as the same tribe, though the former is coastal and the latter an inland tribe. Tindale noted and criticised the conflation.

Alternative names
 Goonine
 Yungkono
 Meeroni
 Maroonee, Meerooni
 Wide Bay tribe. (Palmer, 1884)
 ?Yamma

Notes

Citations

Sources

Aboriginal peoples of Queensland